Anne Clark Martindell (July 18, 1914 – June 11, 2008) was an American Democratic Party politician from New Jersey, as well as a diplomat who served as United States Ambassador to New Zealand from 1979 to 1981.

Early life and family
Anne Clark was born in New York City on July 18, 1914, to William and Marjory Bruce (née Blair) Clark, a daughter of investment banker C. Ledyard Blair.  Her younger brother was Blair Clark, a liberal journalist and activist. After her parents divorce in 1947, her father remarried to journalist Sonia Tomara.

After attending boarding school in Maryland she enrolled at Smith College in 1932. After one year at Smith, she was forbidden from returning to campus by her father, William Clark, a federal judge in Newark, who would later be appointed to the United States Court of Appeals for the Third Circuit.  He forced her to withdraw from the college, fearing that an educated woman would be unmarriageable.

Much later in life she would return to Smith and earn a B.A. degree in 2002, at the age of 87. Smith also honored its oldest graduate with an honorary Doctor of Laws degree.

Marriages
Following her departure from Smith she returned home to Princeton, New Jersey, and married George Cole Scott Jr., a stockbroker, in 1934. They had three children together: Marjory Scott Luther, George C. Scott III; and David C. Scott. The marriage ended in divorce after 13 years.

Upon her divorce she met and later married Jackson Martindell, publisher of Marquis Who's Who, the company that annually produces Who's Who in America, in 1948. Together they had a son, Roger, who served on the Princeton Borough Council.

Career
Martindell was already in her fifties when she became active in Democratic politics. Her brother Blair Clark was the national campaign director for  Eugene McCarthy in the 1968 presidential campaign. She attended the 1968 Democratic National Convention in Chicago to show support for McCarthy, as well as for New Jersey gubernatorial candidate Robert B. Meyner, a friend of the family. After the convention, Meyner asked Martindell to become vice chair of the New Jersey Democratic State Committee. At the end of her four-year appointment, local Democrats encouraged Martindell to run for New Jersey Senate in 1973 in a traditionally Republican district encompassing parts of Hunterdon, Mercer, Middlesex and Morris Counties. She managed to beat incumbent State Sen. William E. Schluter in a year when Republicans battled the specter of the Watergate scandal and Democrats were buoyed by the landslide victory of Brendan Byrne as Governor of New Jersey.

In her four years in the State Senate, Martindell worked primarily on women's issues, education, and the environment. She served as chair of the Education Committee, member of the Appropriations Committee, chair of the Budget Revision Subcommittee  for Higher Education, chair of the Joint State Library Committee, member of the Senate Nursing Home Commission, and chair of the Committee to Defeat Casino Gambling. Martindell was a delegate for Jimmy Carter at the 1976 Democratic National Convention and was an active campaigner for Carter in New Jersey. When Carter was elected president, Martindell resigned from the New Jersey Senate in 1977 to take a series of federal appointments. She was succeeded in the Senate by Walter E. Foran, then serving in the New Jersey General Assembly, who won a special election to fill the remainder of Martindell's term as well as the general election for a full four-year term.

Diplomatic career
Martindell was first appointed to the Commission to Review Ambassadorial Appointments and later became director of the Office of Foreign Disaster Assistance, surveying natural-disaster reconstruction efforts funded by USAID. Her work garnered the attention of the ambassadorship review board, which recommended her candidacy to Carter for the position of United States Ambassador to New Zealand. Martindell was nominated for the ambassadorship and served from 1979 to 1981. She was the first woman to serve as ambassador to New Zealand.

Martindell signed the Treaty of Tokehega on behalf of the United States, which delimited the maritime boundary between Tokelau and American Samoa. On her return from New Zealand, Martindell continued to foster close relations between the two countries, organizing the United States–New Zealand Council in 1986 and serving as the council's first president.

Martindell's memoir Never Too Late was published in 2008. She died on June 11, 2008, at the age of 93.

References

External links

Anne Martindell Papers at the Seeley G. Mudd Manuscript Library, Princeton University
Biographical information for Anne Clark Martindell from The Political Graveyard
Smith College Tribute to Anne Martindell '32 and '02
Anne Martindell Papers, Princeton University Library
Martindell combined gentility and a commitment to the voiceless from PolitickerNJ.com

1914 births
2008 deaths
Democratic Party New Jersey state senators
People from Princeton, New Jersey
Politicians from Mercer County, New Jersey
Smith College alumni
Ambassadors of the United States to New Zealand
Ambassadors of the United States to Samoa
Women state legislators in New Jersey
20th-century American politicians
20th-century American women politicians
American women ambassadors
20th-century American diplomats
21st-century American women